Waldwick may refer to the following:

Places
United States
Waldwick, New Jersey
Waldwick High School
Waldwick (NJT station)
Waldwick Public School District
Waldwick, Wisconsin, a town
Waldwick (community), Wisconsin, an unincorporated community

See also
 Waldwic in Hale County, Alabama